The Biñan Football Stadium is a track and field and football venue in Biñan, Laguna, Philippines.

On October 28, 2015, the Biñan city government and the Philippine Football Federation signed a memorandum of understanding agreeing that the stadium shall be the home stadium of the Philippine women's national football team as well as the national youth teams at least until 2019. The stadium was upgraded in anticipation of its hosting of football matches of the 2019 Southeast Asian Games.

Specifications
The Biñan Football Stadium has a seating capacity of 3,000.The football field is 66 meters wide and 102 meters long. E-Sports installed the artificial grass field named Diamond 50 from Italian company. The sporting field was also rated FIFA 2 star by Kiwa ISA Sport B.V., a FIFA-accredited testing institute based in the Netherlands.

Five lighting towers were provided by American company Musco which is based from Iowa. The towers are able to provide 1400 lx of light. The grandstand is around four and a half meters away from the track and will have no vertical pillars. Four dressing rooms are also hosted. A boxing ring is planned to be put inside the grandstand. It hosts an air-conditioned media center, ticketing booths, portalets, baggage areas, and VIP lounge. A  scoreboard is installed behind one of the two goals.

Sports events held at the Biñan Football Stadium
2017 Philippines Football League
2018 Philippines Football League
2018 Copa Paulino Alcantara
2019 Philippines Football League
2019 Copa Paulino Alcantara
2019 Southeast Asian Games 
2022 AFF Women's Championship
2022–23 Philippines Football League

References

Athletics (track and field) venues in the Philippines
Football venues in the Philippines
Buildings and structures in Biñan
Sports in Laguna (province)
Sports venues completed in 2015
Southeast Asian Games football venues